Savo Millini  or Savio Mellini (Rome, 4 July 1644 – Rome, 10 February 1701) was a Roman Catholic cardinal.

Biography
Millini was born on 4 July 1644 to Mario and his wife Ginevra (née di Neri Capponi). He was a great-nephew of Cardinal Giovanni Garsia and both his parents were members of families of the Roman civic nobility. After studying at Rome University, he took orders in 1668. On 28 Jun 1675, he was consecrated as Archbishop of Caesarea. In the same year he was nominated Papal nuncio to Madrid. He was appointed a cardinal and bishop of Orvieto in 1681.

Episcopal succession
While bishop, he was the principal consecrator of:

References

1644 births
1701 deaths
18th-century Italian cardinals
17th-century Italian cardinals
Clergy from Rome